Dr. Mahmood Razi was a Minister in President Mohamed Nasheed's cabinet from 2008 to 2011 in the Maldives. He first served as the Minister of State for Civil Aviation and Communication, later being appointed as the Minister of Civil Aviation and Communication in 2009 and then as the Minister of Economic Development in July 2010.

References

Government ministers of the Maldives
Living people
Year of birth missing (living people)